Feridun Hadi Sinirlioğlu (b. 30 January 1956, Giresun) is a Turkish diplomat and politician. He is the Permanent Representative of Turkey to the United Nations since 2016. He previously served as the Minister of Foreign Affairs of Turkey from August 2015 to November 2015.

Early life and career
Sinirlioğlu was born in 1956 in Görele, Giresun Province. He graduated from Ankara University’s Faculty of Political Science with a B.A. in 1978. He holds an M.A. and a Ph.D. in political science and international relations from Boğaziçi University. His doctoral dissertation was on Kant’s political philosophy.

Diplomatic and bureaucratic career

Foreign roles
Sinirlioğlu joined the Ministry of Foreign Affairs in 1982. After working at the Human Resources Department and the Multilateral Cultural Relations Department in Ankara, he was appointed in 1983 to the Turkish Embassy in The Hague where he served as Second Secretary and then First Secretary between 1985-1988. He was then transferred to the Turkish Embassy in Beirut where he served as Deputy Chief of Mission until 1990. Returning to Ankara, between 1991 and 1992 he worked as First Secretary at the Bilateral Political Department in charge of Greece, as Special Advisor to the Deputy Undersecretary for Bilateral Political Affairs, as Special Advisor to the Undersecretary and then as Speechwriter to the Prime Minister. Following that, he served as Political Counselor at Turkey’s Mission to the United Nations in New York from 1992 until 1996.

In 1996, he became Chief Foreign Policy Advisor to President Süleyman Demirel. After serving the President for four years, in 2000 he became Deputy Director General for the MIDI’ler East and North Africa. He was appointed as Ambassador to Israel in 2002. Upon his return to Ankara in 2007, he became Deputy Under Secretary for Bilateral Political Affairs. He was promoted as Undersecretary of the Ministry of Foreign Affairs in August 2009. He served in that capacity until August 2015.

Sinirlioğlu served as the Minister of Foreign Affairs for the interim government between 28 August 2015 and 24 November 2015. He was then reappointed as Undersecretary and served in that capacity until October 2016, when he assumed his position as the Permanent Representative of the Republic of Turkey to the United Nations.

Minister of Foreign Affairs
Sinirlioğlu served as the Minister of Foreign Affairs for the interim government between 28 August and 24 November 2015.

See also
List of Turkish civil servants

References

External links
Biography on the Ministry of Foreign Affairs website
Collection of all relevant news items at Haberler.com

1956 births
Ambassadors of Turkey to Israel
Ankara University alumni
Boğaziçi University alumni
Living people
Members of the 63rd government of Turkey
Ministers of Foreign Affairs of Turkey
People from Görele
Turkish civil servants
Permanent Representatives of Turkey to the United Nations
21st-century Turkish diplomats